Masquerade is a 1988 American romantic mystery thriller film directed by Bob Swaim and starring Rob Lowe, Meg Tilly, Kim Cattrall and Doug Savant. Written by Dick Wolf, the film is about a recently orphaned millionairess who falls in love with a young yacht racing captain who isn't completely truthful with her about his past. The film was nominated for the Edgar Allan Poe Award for Best (Mystery) Motion Picture in 1989.

Plot
Young yachting captain Tim Whalen is having an affair with Brooke Morrison, the wife of his boss, Granger Morrison, in the upscale town of Southampton, Long Island. Tim is the new captain of Granger's racing sailboat Obsession. Young heiress Olivia Lawrence, following the recent death of her mother, returns home to Southampton after graduating from college. At a party, Olivia is introduced to Tim, who asks her to dance. Impressed with her knowledge of sailing, Tim asks her to go sailing with him, and she accepts.

Olivia is living in the family mansion with her alcoholic stepfather, Tony Gateworth, and his new live-in girlfriend, Anne Briscoe. Her mother's will provided that Gateworth retain access to the family's eight properties. Olivia has nothing but contempt for her stepfather, who married her mother for her money. At her family attorney's office in New York City, Olivia learns she cannot restrict Gateworth's access to her homes, and the nearly one million dollars a year he receives from the estate barely covers his gambling debts.

Olivia and Tim go sailing on her boat Masquerade, which was her late father's pride and joy. Later, at Olivia's mansion, they are confronted by a drunk Gateworth who insults Tim, his former sailing competitor. In the coming days, Olivia and Tim begin dating and eventually fall in love. However, Olivia's newfound happiness is soon offset by another ugly confrontation with Gateworth who tells her as her "guardian" he wants Tim out of her life. Olivia confides to her aunt that Tim is the first man she has felt comfortable with and that he isn't interested in her money. Later that day, at a lobster house on the outskirts of town, Gateworth and Tim meet surreptitiously to discuss their conspiracy to murder Olivia for her money. When Tim expresses doubts, Gateworth threatens to expose his past. He tells him the next step is to gain Olivia's confidence by having Tim defend her against him.

That weekend, Olivia and Tim have passionate sex in the mansion. Afterwards, a drunken Gateworth breaks into Olivia's room as planned, but Tim double-crosses him and kills Gateworth with his own pistol. Believing they will be accused of murdering Gateworth, Olivia covers up Tim's role in the killing by claiming she killed Gateworth in self-defense. Tim establishes an alibi with an unsuspecting Brooke by resetting her bedside clock. During the investigation, Officer Mike McGill —a childhood friend with a romantic interest in Olivia—finds evidence that Tim may have been involved in the killing, but he does not report it to his captain, presumably because of his feelings for Olivia.

Anne then begins questioning the investigation's findings, and tells the authorities about Olivia and Tim. Meanwhile, Tim breaks up with Brooke, who later confirms Tim's alibi to the police. Not long after Anne informs McGill that her friend saw Gateworth at a diner with Tim, she is found hanged in an apparent suicide. McGill requests an autopsy.

While sailing aboard Masquerade, Olivia asks Tim to marry her, but he is reluctant, telling her he once spent 30 days in jail for writing bad checks. He also tells her about his affair with Brooke. His "honesty" convinces Olivia he is the right man, and the couple are soon married. Later, Olivia reveals she is pregnant. That night, Tim drives to the marina where he meets secretly with McGill, who was part of the original conspiracy—who in fact planned everything. Tim is reluctant about killing Olivia, but McGill insists she must die in a staged car accident. He threatens to put Tim away for Gateworth's murder if he doesn't cooperate.

When McGill learns that Tim has no intention of killing Olivia and that they are planning to sail for Florida on Masquerade the next day, he sabotages Olivia's sailboat and plants incriminating evidence in Tim's linen drawer. Tim discovers McGill's treachery and races to the marina to save Olivia, but is killed in the gas explosion meant to kill Olivia. In the marina office afterwards, Olivia discovers a newspaper clipping with a picture of Tim, Gateworth and McGill, just as McGill enters the office. Seeing that she has figured out the conspiracy, he tries to kill her. In the ensuing struggle, Olivia pushes McGill out a window causing his death.

At Tim's funeral, Olivia learns from her family attorney that Tim had recently insisted he be removed from Olivia's will, and however it may have started, he came to love Olivia in the end.

Cast

 Rob Lowe as Tim Whalen
 Meg Tilly as Olivia Lawrence
 Kim Cattrall as Brooke Morrison
 Doug Savant as Officer Mike McGill
 John Glover as Tony Gateworth
 Dana Delany as Anne Briscoe
 Erik Holland as Chief of Police
 Brian Davies as Granger Morrison
 Barton Heyman as Tommy McGill
 Bernie McInerney as Harland Fitzgerald
 Bill Lopatto as Weyburn
 Pirie MacDonald as Theodore Cantrell
 Maeve McGuire as Aunt Eleanor
 Ira Wheeler as Uncle Charles
 Timothy Landfield as Sam
 Karen McLaughlin as Jillian

 Nada Rowand as Mrs. Chase
 Edwin Bordo as Mortician
 Bruce Tuthill as Lt. Wacker
 James Caulfield as Cop #1
 Boz Scaggs as Cop #2
 Henry Ravelo as Alberto
 Lois Diane Hicks as Judge
 Dorothy Lancaster as Nun
 Marilyn Raphael as Maid
 Dick Wolf as Sedgewick
 Evan O'Neill as Debutante
 Jimmy Raitt as Store Manager
 Robert D. Wilson Sr. as Dock Man
 Michael Tadross as Kid on Dock
 Benjamin Lee Swaim as French Boy #1
 Christopher Thomas Swaim as French Boy #2

Production
The film was originally called Dying for Love. Dick Wolf claimed the title was changed because of studio nervousness due to a series of AIDS-awareness condom ads equating making love with death.

It was the first American film from Bob Swaim. It was greenlit by Alan Ladd Jr. at Metro-Goldwyn-Mayer.

Asked about the torrid sex scene with Rob Lowe, Meg Tilly said, "I have nothing against nudity if it serves a purpose other than bringing in more dollars, but I'd never done a love scene before and I found it hard to do. We all feel sensitive about the way we behave in bed and it's strange having someone watch and correct you--and Bob (Swaim) did give quite a bit of direction in those scenes," she added with a laugh.

Filming locations
The film was shot over ten weeks.
 New York City, New York, USA
 Riverhead, Long Island, New York, USA
 Sag Harbor, Long Island, New York, USA
 Shelter Island, Long Island, New York, USA (boat explosion)
 Southampton, Long Island, New York, USA

Reception

Critical response
The film received mixed reviews upon its release. In his review in the Chicago Sun-Times, Roger Ebert gave the film three of four stars. Ebert singling out Meg Tilly's performance wrote, "Tilly's acting style is the right choice for the movie: Her dreaminess, which at first seems distracting, becomes an important part of the suspense, because while she drifts in her romantic reverie, a sweet smile on her face, we're mentally screaming at her to wake up and smell the coffee."

In her review in The Washington Post, Rita Kempley called the film "mushy" and "pockey". Kempley reduces the director's efforts to "a gym teacher's sense of the erotic matched with a jackhammer's flair for the subtleties of psychological artifice."

Awards and nominations
 1989 Edgar Allan Poe Award Nomination for Best Motion Picture (Dick Wolf)

Box office
The film earned $15,855,828 in gross revenue in the United States.

Film ratings
In New Zealand, the film was rated M for offensive language and sexual references. In the United States, it was rated R.

References

External links

 
 
 

1988 films
1988 romance films
1988 thriller films
1980s mystery thriller films
1980s romantic thriller films
American mystery thriller films
American romantic thriller films
Films directed by Bob Swaim
Films scored by John Barry (composer)
Metro-Goldwyn-Mayer films
Seafaring films
Films about the upper class
1980s English-language films
1980s American films